Krnice may refer to several settlements in Slovenia: 

Idrijske Krnice, a settlement in the Municipality of Idrija (known as (Idrske) Krnice until 1952/1980)
Krnice, Hrastnik, a settlement in the Municipality of Hrastnik
Krnice pri Novakih, a settlement in the Municipality of Gorenja Vas–Poljane
Ledinske Krnice, a settlement in the Municipality of Idrija (known as Krnice until 1952)